Danza II: Electric Boogaloo is the second release by the mathcore band The Tony Danza Tapdance Extravaganza. The album was released on October 16, 2007 via Guy Kozowyk's Black Market Activities and distributed by Metal Blade Records.

Background 
Danza II is a concept album focusing on a protagonist named Cecil Bennett, a man with dwarfism and a short temper that  visits a bar one night and eventually murders everyone in the establishment when he grows tired of everyone's taunting comments.

The album was produced by Jeremiah Scott of Demon Hunter and Destroy Destroy Destroy. Following the album's release, every member but vocalist Jessie Freeland left the band. Freeland would later resume TTDTE by recruiting guitarist Josh Travis and drummer Mike Bradley. The trio would then go on to create Danza III: The Series of Unfortunate Events (2010).

Track listing

Personnel
The Tony Danza Tapdance Extravaganza 
 Jessie Freeland – vocals
 Brad Thompson – guitar
 Layne Meylain – guitar, art direction 
 Mike Butler – bass
 Mason Crooks – drums

Additional
 Jeremiah Scott – sound designer, production, engineer, additional vocals on track 13
 Bruce Fitzhugh – additional vocals on track 6
 Ben Pearson – performer on tracks 1, 5, 11, and 13
 John Judkins – lap steel guitar on tracks 1, 2, 13b
 Dennis Sibeijn – art direction

References

The Tony Danza Tapdance Extravaganza albums
2007 albums
Black Market Activities albums
Concept albums